The 1994 United States Senate Election in New Jersey was held November 8, 1994. Incumbent Democratic U.S. Senator Frank Lautenberg won re-election to a third term.

Democratic primary

Candidates 
 Frank Lautenberg, incumbent United States Senator
 Bill Campbell, licensed engineer for PSE&G
 Lynne A. Speed, follower of the LaRouche movement

Results

Republican primary

Candidates 
Chuck Haytaian, Speaker of the New Jersey State Assembly
Brian T. Kennedy, former member of the New Jersey Senate

Results

General Election

Candidates 
 Arlene Gold (Natural Law)
 Ben Grindlinger (Libertarian)
 Chuck Haytaian (Republican), Speaker of the New Jersey State Assembly
 Michael Kelly (Keep America First)
 Joanne Kuniansky (Socialist Workers)
 Frank Lautenberg (Democratic), incumbent U.S. Senator
 Andrea Lippi (Jobs, Property Rights)
 Richard J. Pezzullo (Conservative)
 George Patrick Predham (Damn Drug Dealers)

Campaign
Lautenberg took no part in much of the summer campaign, delegating duties to his campaign director David Eichenbaum. Haytaian became so frustrated with the Senator's absence that he referred to Eichenbaum as Lautenberg's "paid mouthpiece" and his campaign aides began to refer to "Senator Eichenbaum" in their campaign materials.

Haytaian centered his campaign on reducing federal taxes through the institution of a flat federal income tax of 18.5%. Throughout the campaign, Haytaian emphasized taxes and fiscal issues over social issues. Eichenbaum, standing in for Lautenberg, referred to Haytaian's flat tax as a "giveaway to the rich" and criticized Haytaian as a "hypocrite" for previously opposing a flat state tax plan because it would have eliminated home mortgage interest and state and local tax deductions. Haytaian fired back that in 1982, Lautenberg had called a flat tax "the only one that can quickly close the loopholes." 

Campaign advertisements for both candidates were highly negative. Both candidates positioned themselves as tough on crime and taxes, which polling showed were the two major issues in the state. Haytaian stressed his support for the death penalty and Lautenberg's opposition.

Abortion was also an issue; Lautenberg supported abortion rights, while Haytaian favored mandatory waiting periods, parental notification for minors, and a ban on federal funding of abortion except in cases of rape, incest, or where necessary to save the life of a pregnant mother. In the past, Haytaian had supported a constitutional ban.

Debates
Lautenberg agreed to two debates on October 15 and 25.

Endorsements

Polling

Results 

Haytaian remarked after the race that he was most disappointed by the margins of his losses in Bergen and Middlesex counties.

See also 
 1994 United States Senate elections

References 

1994
New Jersey
1994 New Jersey elections